Hyaluronoglucuronidase (hyaluronidase, glucuronoglucosaminoglycan hyaluronate lyase, orgelase) is an enzyme with systematic name hyaluronate 3-glycanohydrolase. This enzyme catalyses the following chemical reaction

 Random hydrolysis of (1->3)-linkages between beta-D-glucuronate and N-acetyl-D-glucosamine residues in hyaluronate

References

External links 

EC 3.2.1